The Agate Casket of Oviedo (sometimes in English Agate Box, "Box of Agates") is an elaborately decorated box, casket or small chest given by King Fruela II of Asturias and his wife Nunila to the Cathedral of San Salvador, Oviedo, Spain. This masterpiece of 10th century Asturian gold work is kept in the Cámara Santa (Holy Chamber) treasury.

Construction 
It is a rectangular box made of wood of European Pear, with a lid in the shape of a truncated pyramid. The wooden box is covered with sheets of gold forming unequal arches in which 99 large flat sections of veined agate are mounted. The gold is decorated with cabochon gemstones and coral. The top of the lid is a gold plaque with a cross and three large gems which was taken from an older piece. It is decorated with small animals in enamel in a kind of champlevé technique that is only found in one other work, the South German rear cover of the Lindau Gospels, of the late 8th century, now in the Morgan Library, New York.

The base of the box is made of pure silver, with a cross made of gems and with a carved tetramorph, representing the four evangelists: the angel of St. Matthew, the Lion of St. Mark, the ox of St. Luke and the eagle of St. John. The inscription which describes the donation of the box to the cathedral is engraved on the basex. It reads:

Notes

References 
 
 
 Lasko, Peter, Ars Sacra, 800-1200, Yale University Press, 1995 (2nd edn.)

External links
The Art of medieval Spain, A.D. 500-1200, an exhibition catalog from The Metropolitan Museum of Art Libraries (fully available online as PDF), which contains material on Agate Casket of Oviedo (no. 71, pp. 143-145)

Asturian culture
Gold objects
Medieval art
Religion in Asturias
Spanish art